The 2003 NCAA Division II Men's Lacrosse Championship was the 19th annual tournament to determine the national champions of NCAA Division II men's college lacrosse in the United States.

The final was played at M&T Bank Stadium, the home stadium of the NFL Baltimore Ravens, in Baltimore, Maryland. In a tradition that remains, this was the first tournament final held in the same venue as the concurrent Division I and Division III NCAA men's lacrosse tournaments.

In a rematch of the previous year's final, NYIT defeated defending champions Limestone in the championship game, 9–4, to claim the Bears' second Division II national title.

Bracket

See also
2003 NCAA Division II Women's Lacrosse Championship
2003 NCAA Division I Men's Lacrosse Championship
2003 NCAA Division III Men's Lacrosse Championship

References

NCAA Division II Men's Lacrosse Championship
NCAA Division II Men's Lacrosse Championship
NCAA Division II Men's Lacrosse